Xylita is a genus of beetles belonging to the family Melandryidae.

The species of this genus are found in Europe and Northern America.

Species:
 Xylita laevigata (Hellenius, 1786)
 Xylita nagaii

References

Melandryidae
Polyphaga genera